William Kingston (c. 1476–1540)  was constable of the Tower of London during the reign of Henry VIII.

William Kingston may also refer to:

William Henry Giles Kingston (1814–1880), writer of tales for boys 
William Kingston (cricketer) (1874–1956), English cricketer for Northamptonshire

See also
William Kingston Flesher (1825–1907), Canadian businessman and political figure
William Kingston Vickery (1851–1925), Irish-American art dealer